Tandjilé Ouest is one of two departments in Tandjilé, a region of Chad. Its capital is Kélo.

Departments of Chad
Tandjilé Region